Christina Bertrup (born 23 December 1976) is a Swedish curler. She presently throws third rock for Margaretha Sigfridsson.

Curling career 
Bertrup began her international curling career as the alternate player for Elisabet Gustafson. With Gustafson, she won a gold medal at the 2000 European Curling Championships, and placed 6th at the 2002 Winter Olympics.

Gustafson retired after the Olympics, and Bertrup was without a team. She wouldn't return to the international curling scene until being picked up by Stina Viktorsson in 2010. Bertrup played third for the team, and they won a gold medal at the 2010 European Curling Championships.

Viktorsson left the team in 2011, and was replaced at the fourth position by Maria Prytz. The team's lead, Sigfridsson assumed skipping duties. They won a silver medal at the 2011 European Curling Championships, and the rink was chosen to represent Sweden at the 2012 Ford World Women's Curling Championship, where they would go on to win a silver medal. The next season, the team would win a bronze medal at the 2012 European Curling Championships and a silver medal at the 2013 World Women's Curling Championship.

For the 2013-14 curling season, the team won the gold medal at the 2013 European Curling Championships, a silver medal at the 2014 Winter Olympics and  a 5th place finish at the 2014 World Women's Curling Championship. Since their Olympic season, the team would finish 7th at the 2015 World Women's Curling Championship and 9th at the 2016 World Women's Curling Championship.

In 2009 she was inducted into the Swedish Curling Hall of Fame.

Personal life
Bertrup has a partner and two children.

References

External links
 

1976 births
Living people
Swedish female curlers
Curlers at the 2002 Winter Olympics
Curlers at the 2014 Winter Olympics
Olympic curlers of Sweden
Olympic silver medalists for Sweden
Olympic medalists in curling
Medalists at the 2014 Winter Olympics
European curling champions
Swedish curling champions
Continental Cup of Curling participants